Carmen Delgado Votaw was a civil rights pioneer, a public servant, an author, and community leader. She studied at the University of Puerto Rico and graduated from American University in Washington, D.C., with a bachelor of arts in international studies. She was subsequently awarded an honorary doctorate in humanities by Hood College in Frederick, Maryland.

Career
Votaw was appointed by President Jimmy Carter to serve as cochair of the National Advisory Committee for Women. She served as president of the Interamerican Commission of Women of the Organization of American States in 1979–80. The first president of that body, she remains just one of two women from the United States to have served as the commission's president.

During her career, Votaw travelled to more than 80 countries and met with more than 50 heads of state. She was a member of the U.S. delegation to the International Women's Year conference, attending conferences in Mexico City, Copenhagen, Nairobi and Beijing.

Votaw was chief of staff for Puerto Rico's Resident Commissioner Jaime B. Fuster from 1985–91. As the first Hispanic female chief of staff for a Member of Congress, she worked to address the challenges facing 3.5 million Puerto Ricans living on the island and to build a strong network for women in the Federal Government. After leaving the U.S. House of Representatives, she was involved with the Girl Scouts of the USA, United Way of America, and the Alliance for Children and Families.

Votaw was an author of a number of publications on women, including Puerto Rican Women: Mujeres Puertorriquenas, Notable American Women, Libro de Oro, and To Ourselves Be True. These stories highlight the accomplishments of women, particularly Hispanic women, who led remarkable lives and serve as role models for younger women.

Activism
As a defender of civil rights for diverse populations, especially Hispanics, Votaw received the Hispanic Heritage Award for Education, the Mexican American Women's Primeras Award, and numerous awards from NASA, FEW, and national and local civic organizations. Votaw served on the boards of directors of numerous women's organizations, including the National Conference of Puerto Rican Women, which she served as national president and president of the DC chapter, the Overseas Education Fund of the League of Women's Voters, the Girl Scouts of the USA, the International Girl Guides, the National Women's Political Caucus and its Appointments Coalition, the Mid-Atlantic Equity Center, and the National Coalition for Women and Girls in Education. She was also active with the Congressional Hispanic Caucus Institute, the Gala Hispanic Theatre, and the Maryland Women's Heritage Center, and she was a member of the Council on Foreign Relations.

In 1978, Votaw became an associate of the Women's Institute for Freedom of the Press (WIFP). WIFP is an American nonprofit publishing organization. The organization works to increase communication between women and connect the public with forms of women-based media.

Awards
In 1992, Votaw was inducted into the Maryland Women's Hall of Fame for her numerous contributions to the community. For her leadership in education, she was a 1996 recipient of the National Hispanic Heritage Award, presented at the Kennedy Center in Washington, D.C. In 2007, The National Cuban American Women's Association Award. she earned the Foremother Award from the National Center for Health Research. In addition, she was recognized by the National Women's History Project for Distinguished Lifetime Achievement in 2014.

References

Online references
 Congressional Record
 Veteran Feminists of America
 Montgomery County Commission for Women
 State of Maryland Archives
 Clearinghouse on Women's Issues
 Twitter
 Carmen Delgado Votaw Scholarship: National Conference of Puerto Rican Women
 University of Denver: Center for Multicultural Excellence

Newspaper and journal articles
 
 National Women's History Project. Women's History 2014 Gazette Vol. 6
 Washington Post: Womans History Month: Honoring women for their courage, character and commitment. March, 2014

Video
 In 2020, she was played by actress Andrea Navedo in the Hulu miniseries Mrs. America.
 Honoring Carmen Delgado-Votaw and Edna Laverdi – YouTube
 Puerto Ricans in Public Service-Washington, D.C.
 TOP OF THE MORNING Carmen Delgado Votaw
 Sisters of '77. Directed by Cynthia Salzman Mondell and Allen Mondell. Dallas, Texas: Circle R Media, 2005. DVD.
 Votaw, Carmen Delgado. "Carmen Delgado Votaw: Talks about her work in Washington and the Women's Movement", I Care Village video.

Books
 Votaw, Carmen Delgado. Puerto Rican Women/Mujeres Puertorriqueñas. Washington, D.C.: National Conference of Puerto Rican Women, 1995.
 Votaw, Carmen Delgado. "Face to Face with Power." In True to Ourselves, edited by Nancy Neuman, 68–79. San Francisco, California: Jossey-Bass, Inc., 1998.
 Votaw, Carmen Delgado. In Feminists Who Changed America, 1963–1975, edited by Barbara Love and Nancy Cott, 473. (Champaign, Illinois: University of Illinois Press, 2006).
 Votaw, Carmen Delgado, in Notable Hispanic American Women, 1980

Other
 Carter, Jimmy. "National Commission on the Observance of International Women's Year, 1975 Appointment of Members and Presiding Officer of the Commission." March 28, 1977. 
 "Carmen Delgado Votaw." In Notable Hispanic American Women. August 20, 1998. Biography Resource Center.
 "Carmen Delgado Votaw", in Marquis Who's Who™, 2006, Biography Resource Center. Courtesy of the Maryland State Archives.
 Maryland Women's Heritage Center. "Executive Board."
 Montgomery County Commission for Women. "40 Women of Historical Significance in Montgomery County: Carmen Delgado Votaw." 
 Carmen Delgado Votaw Papers, Hood College Archives.

1935 births
2017 deaths
American University alumni
American politicians of Puerto Rican descent
Hispanic and Latino American politicians
Hispanic and Latino American women in politics
People from Yabucoa, Puerto Rico
Puerto Rican women in politics